Moween is a  village located on the Conemaugh River and is part of Loyalhanna Township in Westmoreland County, Pennsylvania, United States. The approximate population is 150 residents.
School age children in the village of Moween attend Saltsburg Jr./Sr. High School.
Businesses in and around Moween include Hoovers Stone Quarry and Tuscano-Maher Roofing, Inc.

Moween is considered part of Saltsburg due to its  proximity to the larger town.

Unincorporated communities in Pennsylvania
Unincorporated communities in Westmoreland County, Pennsylvania
Pittsburgh metropolitan area